The Palestine women's national football team represents Palestine in international women's football competitions. The team was founded by Samar Araj in 2003. Its first game was a match against Jordan in 2005, which it lost 1–0. The women's team made three appearances in West Asian Football Federation Championship since 2005.

Results and fixtures

The following is a list of match results in the last 12 months, as well as any future matches that have been scheduled.

 Legend

2022

2023

Coaching staff

Current coaching staff

Historical 
 Simon G.S. Khair(??--2022)

Players

Current squad
The following players were called up for the 2022 WAFF Women's Championship in September 2022.

Recent call-ups
The following players have been called up to the squad in the past 12 months.

Previous squads
2022 WAFF Women's Championship
2022 WAFF Women's Championship  squad

Competitive record

FIFA Women's World Cup

*Draws include knockout matches decided on penalty kicks.

Olympic Games

*Draws include knockout matches decided on penalty kicks.

AFC Women's Asian Cup

*Draws include knockout matches decided on penalty kicks.

Asian Games

WAFF Women's Championship

*Draws include knockout matches decided on penalty kicks.

Arab Women's Championship

Arabia Cup

See also
History of sport in Palestine
Sport in Palestine
Football in the State of Palestine
Women's football in Palestinian
Palestine women's national under-20 football team
Palestine women's national under-17 football team
Palestine men's national football team

References

External links
Official website
FIFA profile

َArabic women's national association football teams
Football in the State of Palestine
Asian women's national association football teams
Women's sport in the State of Palestine
W